Dizə or Diza may refer to:
 Dizə, Julfa, Azerbaijan
 Dizə, Ordubad, Azerbaijan
 Dizə, Sharur, Azerbaijan
 Diza, Iran (disambiguation)